Lyakhlya is a rural locality (a selo) and the administrative centre of Lyakhlinsky Selsoviet, Khivsky District, Republic of Dagestan, Russia. The population was 612 as of 2010. There are 9 streets.

Geography 
Lyakhlya is located 22 km north of Khiv (the district's administrative centre) by road. Garig is the nearest rural locality.

References 

Rural localities in Khivsky District